Constructor theory is a proposal for a new mode of explanation in fundamental physics in the language of ergodic theory, developed  by physicists David Deutsch and Chiara Marletto, at the University of Oxford, since 2012. Constructor theory expresses physical laws exclusively in terms of which physical transformations, or tasks, are possible versus which are impossible, and why. By allowing such counterfactual statements into fundamental physics, it allows new physical laws to be expressed, such as the constructor theory of information.

Overview
The fundamental elements of the theory are tasks: the abstract specifications of transformations as input–output pairs of attributes. A task is impossible if there is a law of physics that forbids its being performed with arbitrarily high accuracy, and possible otherwise. When it is possible, a constructor for it can be built, again with arbitrary accuracy and reliability. A constructor is an entity that can cause the task to occur while retaining the ability to cause it again. Examples of constructors include a heat engine (a thermodynamic constructor), a catalyst (a chemical constructor) or a computer program controlling an automated factory (an example of a programmable constructor).

The theory was developed by physicists David Deutsch and Chiara Marletto. It draws together ideas from diverse areas, including thermodynamics, statistical mechanics, information theory, and quantum computation.

Quantum mechanics and all other physical theories are claimed to be subsidiary theories, and quantum information becomes a special case of superinformation.

Chiara Marletto's constructor theory of life builds on constructor theory.

Motivations
According to Deutsch, current theories of physics, based on quantum mechanics, do not adequately explain why some transformations between states of being are possible and some are not. For example, a drop of dye can dissolve in water, but thermodynamics shows that the reverse transformation, of the dye clumping back together, is effectively impossible.
We do not know at a quantum level why this should be so. Constructor theory provides an explanatory framework built on the transformations themselves, rather than the components.

Information has the property that a given statement might have said something else, and one of these alternatives would not be true. The untrue alternative is said to be "counterfactual". Conventional physical theories do not model such counterfactuals. However, the link between information and such physical ideas as the entropy in a thermodynamic system is so strong that they are sometimes identified. For example, the area of a black hole's event horizon is a measure both of the hole's entropy and of the information that it contains, as per the Bekenstein bound. Constructor theory is an attempt to bridge this gap, providing a physical model that can express counterfactuals, thus allowing the laws of information and computation to be viewed as laws of physics.

Outline
In constructor theory, a transformation or change is described as a task. A constructor is a physical entity that is able to carry out a given task repeatedly. A task is only possible if a constructor capable of carrying it out exists, otherwise it is impossible. To work with constructor theory, everything is expressed in terms of tasks. The properties of information are then expressed as relationships between possible and impossible tasks. Counterfactuals are thus fundamental statements, and the properties of information may be described by physical laws.
If a system has a set of attributes, then the set of permutations of these attributes is seen as a set of tasks. A computation medium is a system whose attributes permute to always produce a possible task. The set of permutations, and hence of tasks, is a computation set. If it is possible to copy the attributes in the computation set, the computation medium is also an information medium.

Information, or a given task, does not rely on a specific constructor. Any suitable constructor will serve. This ability of information to be carried on different physical systems or media is described as interoperability and arises as the principle that the combination of two information media is also an information medium.
Media capable of carrying out quantum computations are called superinformation media and are characterised by specific properties. Broadly, certain copying tasks on their states are impossible tasks. This is claimed to give rise to all the known differences between quantum and classical information.

See also
 Calculating Space
 Computability theory
 Undecidable problem
 Quantum circuit

References

Bibliography
 
 Marletto, Chiara (2021). The Science of Can and Can't. Penguin. ISBN 9780525521921.

External links
 
 "Deeper Than Quantum Mechanics—David Deutsch’s New Theory of Reality" Mediums.com's The Physics arXiv Blog. 28 May 2014.
 Kehoe, J.; "To What Extent Do We See with Mathematics?". Scientific American Guest blog. 2013.
 "Formulating Science in Terms of Possible and Impossible Tasks". edge.org. 12 June 2014.
 

Fringe physics